The Diocese of Columbus is a Latin Church ecclesiastical territory, or diocese, of the Catholic Church covering 23 counties in the U.S. state of Ohio. The episcopal see of the diocese is situated at Columbus. The diocese was erected on March 3, 1868, by Pope Pius IX out of the Archdiocese of Cincinnati. The Diocese of Columbus is a suffragan diocese in the ecclesiastical province of the metropolitan Archdiocese of Cincinnati.

Geography 
The Diocese of Columbus contains 108 parishes in 23 counties: 

Coshocton, Delaware, Fairfield, Fayette, Franklin, Hardin, Hocking, Holmes, Jackson, Knox, Licking, Madison, Marion, Morrow, Muskingum, Perry, Pickaway, Pike, Ross, Scioto, Tuscarawas, Union, and Vinton.

History

1700 to 1860 
During the 17th century, present day Ohio was part of the French colony of New France. The Diocese of Quebec, had jurisdiction over the region. In 1763, Ohio Country became part of the British Province of Quebec, forbidden from settlement by American colonists. After the American Revolution, the Ohio area became part of the new United States.  For Catholics, Ohio was now under the jurisdiction of the Archdiocese of Baltimore, which then comprised the entire country.

In 1808. Pope Pius VII erected the Diocese of Bardstown in Kentucky, with jurisdiction over the new state of Ohio along with the other midwest states. Dominican priests from Bardstown were the first missionaries and clergy in the Columbus area The first Catholic chapel built in the new state of Ohio was a log structure in Perry County; it was dedicated on December 6, 1818, by then Reverend Edward Fenwick

Pope Pius VII on June 19, 1821, erected the Diocese of Cincinnati, taking the entire state of Ohio from the Diocese of Bardstown. The visit of Cincinnati Bishop John Purcell, to central Ohio in June 1836, began the activity of the Catholic Church in the city of Columbus. After saying Mass in a house on Canal Street on June 5, Purcell asked the Catholic men in attendance to meet regarding the construction of a church. A plan was developed to build a church on a lot already owned by the Catholics of the area—where Holy Cross Church now stands. In 1837, the diocese sent a resident pastor, Reverend Henry Juncker, to cover the Columbus and  Chillicothe, Ohio areas. He built Holy Cross Church on the site owned by the parishioners, opening it on  April 29, 1838 with a Sung Mass. By 1843, Holy Cross parish was scheduling multiple masses on Sundays and building a school.

1860 to 1900 
At the close of the Second Plenary Council of Baltimore in 1866, the American bishops petitioned Pope Pius IX to establish a new diocese with its seat in Columbus. On March 3, 1868, the pope erected the Diocese of Columbus, encompassing the portions of Ohio "...lying south of 40' and 41" and between the Ohio River on the East and the Scioto River on the West together with the Counties of Franklin, Delaware and Morrow." Pius IX appointed Auxiliary Bishop Sylvester Rosecrans from the Archdiocese of Cincinnati as the first bishop of Columbus.

When the diocese was erected, it had only three churches, all in the city of Columbus —Holy Cross, St. Patrick's, and St. Mary's. The diocese was mostly agricultural, having been settled first by Maryland and Pennsylvania residents who had moved west, and then later German and Irish immigrants. Rosecrans established the Catholic Columbian, a newspaper for the diocese, in addition to St. Aloysius Seminary and St. Vincent's Orphan Asylum. He oversaw the construction of St. Joseph Cathedral to its consecration on October 20, 1878, before dying the following morning.

To replace Rosencrans, Pope Leo XIII appointed Reverend John Watterson as the second bishop of Columbus on March 14, 1880. He was consecrated a bishop on August 8, 1880, by Bishop William Elder of Cincinnati. The major challenge facing the diocese was the debt accrued by the construction of the new cathedral. During his 19-year-long tenure, Watterson increased the number of priests and schools in the diocese, oversaw the building of two hospitals and the Pontifical College Josephinum in Columbus and erected many new missions and parishes.

1900 to 1945 
On April 6, 1900, Henry K. Moeller, chancellor of the Archdiocese of Cincinnati, was appointed the third bishop of Columbus by Leo XIII;  he was consecrated a bishop on August 25. During his episcopacy, the diocesan debt was split among the parishes and nearly eliminated in three years and a diocesan synod was convened. Moeller also established missions, parishes, and schools to serve the increasing immigrant population of the Diocese. Moeller was appointed as the coadjutor bishop of the Archdiocese of Cincinnati by Pope Pius X in 1903.

Moeller's replacement, Reverend James Hartley, was appointed bishop on December 10, 1903, and consecrated a bishop February 25, 1904.He was formally installed as bishop in St. Joseph Cathedral on March 1, 1904. During his tenure, Hartley oversaw a significant growth of the diocese In 1905, he erected his first parishes, Holy Rosary and St. Aloysius. In 1906, he retired the debt on St. Joseph Cathedral. Within the first five years of his episcopate, Hartley began or dedicated over 25 churches, schools, and chapels. He established the following institutions in the diocese:

 St. Charles Seminary in Columbus
 St. Joseph Cemetery in Lockbourne
 St. Ann Hospital in Westerville
 Mercy Hospital in Portsmouth
 Good Samaritan Hospital in Zanesville
 Mercy Hospital in Mount Vernon
 St. Therese Shrine in Columbus

Toward the end of his term as bishop, Hartley consecrated Reverend Edward Hettinger as the first auxiliary bishop of the Columbus diocese. Hartley died in 1944.

1945 to 1968 
Pope Pius XII appointed Reverend Michael Ready as bishop of Columbus in 1945.  That same year, the pope established the Diocese of Steubenville He removed 13 counties from the Diocese of Columbus to form the new diocese. (Carroll, Jefferson, Harrison, Guernsey, Belmont, Noble, Monroe, Morgan, Washington, Athens, Meigs, Gallia, and Lawrence) At the same time, the pope added nine counties (Hardin, Marion, Union, Madison, Fayette, Pickaway, Ross, Pike and Scioto) to the Diocese of Columbus from the Archdiocese of Cincinnati.

One of Ready's first tasks was overseeing the erection of the new Diocese of Steubenville. He established the Catholic Welfare Bureau and appointed a director of charities for the diocese. Ready was a critic of the Ohio State University Board of Trustees decision in 1951 that all campus speakers had to be cleared by University President Howard L. Bevis in advance. 

Ready also organized the Holy Name Society, a Parent-Teacher Organization, the Council of Catholic Women, the Catholic Youth Council, and the St. Vincent de Paul Society in the diocese. He created 18 new parishes and oversaw the construction of nine elementary and five high schools. Ready founded two nursing homes, the diocesan Child Guidance Center, and the Catholic Student Center at Ohio State University. He worked with his fellow Ohio bishops to start the Ohio Catholic Welfare Conference.  Ready died in 1957.

Pope Pius XII appointed Auxiliary Bishop Clarence Issenmann of the Archdiocese of Cinncinati as the sixth bishop of the Diocese of Columbus on December 5, 1957. As bishop, Issenmann established the Diocesan Development Fund so as to supply for the expansion of the diocese, which added eight parishes and six high schools under Issenmann. He also found a new building to house diocesan offices, and offered a televised Mass every week. Pope Paul VI named him as coadjutor bishop of the Diocese of Cleveland in 1964.

Bishop John Carberry from the Diocese of Lafayette in Indiana was appointed the seventh bishop of the Diocese of Columbus by Pope Paul VI on January 16, 1965.As bishop, he implemented the reforms of the Second Vatican Council and supported the Civil Rights Movement and ecumenical movement. He established the Clergy Advisory Council, and oversaw the renovation of St. Joseph's Cathedral after issuing regulations for liturgical changes. Carberry also bought a new building to centralize the offices of the diocesan chancery. He helped found the Inter-Church Board for Metropolitan Affairs, the first organization in the United States uniting Protestants and Catholics for ecumenism and social action. In January 1968, he became the first Catholic bishop to receive the Ohio Council of Churches' annual "Pastor of Pastors" award. Carberry was named archbishop of the Archdiocese of St. Louis in 1968.

1968 to 1982 
Paul VI named Auxiliary Bishop Clarence Elwell from the Diocese of Cleveland as the eighth bishop of Columbus on May 29, 1968.During his tenure as bishop, Elwell continued the implementation of the reforms of the Second Vatican Council, initiated under Carberry. An advocate of Catholic education, he opened the following schools in Ohio:

 Tuscarawas Central Catholic High School in New Philadelphia
 William V. Fisher Catholic High School in Lancaster
 Bishop Rosecrans High School in Zanesville

Elwell also converted the diocesan seminary in Columbus into St. Charles College Preparatory School. He also established Resurrection Cemetery in Lewis Center, Ohio, St. Peter Parish in Worthington, Ohio, the Sisters' Council, and the Pastoral Council. He significantly expanded the Development Office, the Parish Aid Fund, and the diocesan self-insurance program. Elwell died in 1973.

Auxiliary Bishop Edward Herrmann from the Archdiocese of Washington was appointed bishop of Columbus on June 26, 1973 by Paul VI. Herrmann helped establish Operation Feed in Columbus, a countywide food drive that now provides millions of meals every year to people in the Columbus area.  He also reorganized the diocese into the 15 vicariates and instituted the Emmaus Spirituality Program for priests.Hermann died in 1982.

1982 to 2020 
On February 7, 1983, John Paul II appointed Auxiliary Bishop James Griffin from the Diocese of Cleveland as the tenth bishop of the Diocese of Columbus.In 1985, Griffin established the Foundation of the Catholic Diocese of Columbus and initiated the Legacy of Catholic Learning campaign in 1989 and Challenge In Changing Times campaign. He also established "Breaking The Silence" task force to reduce family violence. Griffin also served on a number of committees of the United States Conference of Catholic Bishops and was president of Catholic Relief Services (1991–1995).. In 2004, after 21 years as bishop of Columbus, Griffin retired.

On October 14, 2004, John Paul II appointed Auxiliary Bishop Frederick F. Campbell from the Archdiocese of St. Paul and Minneapolis as the eleventh bishop of Columbus. In 2005, Campbell proposed the establishment of a civil registry of priests from the diocese of Columbus who had been "credibly accused" of sexual abuse. Campbell spoke out in 2006 against a proposed law in the Ohio General Assembly that would have allowed a 20-year statute of limitations for sexual abuse cases.   In his testimony to the legislature, Campbell claimed that the 20-year for prosecution window wasn't fair and would curtail the church's charitable work. In the end, the Assembly passed the legislation with a 10-year window.Campbell resigned in 2019.

Pope Francis appointed Auxiliary Bishop Robert J. Brennan from the Diocese of Rockville Centre as bishop of the Diocese of Columbus on January 31, 2019.In December 2020, Brennan announced the "Real Presence Real Future" strategic planning initiative, aiming at "increasing the presence of Christ throughout its 23 counties over the next three years and upholding the Faith for future generations." According to Brennan, the process would likely result in some parishes closing. The elevation of Saint Mary of the Assumption in Lancaster, Ohio, to the rank of a minor basilica was initiated by Brennan in August of 2019.

2020 to present 
In February 2020, the Diocese announced the closure of two diocesan retreat centers, St. Therese's in Columbus, and Sts. Peter and Paul in Newark. The shuttering was due to dwindling use in part because of more parishes having parish centers, newer, non-diocesan facilities being built, and the necessity of repairs at both sites. Sts. Peter and Paul was constructed as a seminary for the Pontifical Institute for Foreign Missions in 1957, and then closed in 1990. It was acquired by the Diocese and reopened as a retreat center in 2003. St. Therese was opened in 1931. However, both sites found new uses as homes for religious sisters serving in the Diocese. St. Therese now houses Daughters of Holy Mary of the Heart of Jesus, a group ministering to girls and young women in the Columbus area, and Sts. Peter and Paul is now the convent for a group of Dominican Nuns of the Perpetual Rosary.

Francis appointed Brennan as bishop of the Diocese of Brooklyn in 2021. Reverend Earl K. Fernandes of the Archdiocese of Cincinnati is the current bishop of Columbus, appointed by Francis in 2022. Fernande has continued the "Real Presence Real Future" process started by Brennan.In October 2022, the Diocese of Steubenville announced that the Vatican was considering a merger with the Diocese of Columbus. The US Conference of Catholic Bishops (USCCB) would have to grant its approval.

Bishops

Bishops of Columbus
 Sylvester Horton Rosecrans (1868–1878)
 John Ambrose Watterson (1880–1899)
 Henry K. Moeller (1900–1903), appointed Coadjutor Archbishop and later Archbishop of Cincinnati
 James Joseph Hartley (1903–1944)
 Michael Joseph Ready (1944–1957)
 Clarence George Issenmann (1957–1964), appointed Coadjutor Bishop and later Bishop of Cleveland
 John Joseph Carberry (1965–1968), appointed Archbishop of Saint Louis (elevated to Cardinal in 1969)
 Clarence Edward Elwell (1968–1973)
 Edward John Herrmann (1973–1982)
 James Anthony Griffin (1983–2004)
 Frederick Francis Campbell (2005–2019)
 Robert J. Brennan (2019–2021), appointed Bishop of Brooklyn
 Earl K. Fernandes (2022–present)

Auxiliary bishops of Columbus
Edward Gerard Hettinger (1941–1977)
George Avis Fulcher (1976–1983), appointed Bishop of Lafayette in Indiana

Other diocesan priests who became bishops
Nicholas Aloysius Gallagher, appointed Apostolic Administrator of Galveston in 1882
Francis William Howard, appointed Bishop of Covington in 1923

Parishes

As of 2020, the Diocese of Columbus comprises 103 parishes and two missions. The parishes are divided into the following deaneries:

Center - South Columbus Deanery 
Community of Holy Rosary/St. John the Evangelist, Columbus (African American; 1979)
Corpus Christi, Columbus (1923)
Holy Cross, Columbus (German; 1846)
Sts. Augustine & Gabriel, Columbus (Vietnamese; 1925)
St. Dominic, Columbus (African American; 1889)
St. Joseph Cathedral, Columbus (1866)
St. Ladislas, Columbus (Hungarian/Croatian; 1908)
St. Mary of the Assumption, Columbus (German; 1865)
St. Patrick, Columbus (Irish; 1852)
St. Thomas the Apostle, Columbus (1900)
St. Leo the Great (1902)

Northwest Columbus Deanery 
Our Lady of Victory, Marble Cliff (1922)
St. Agatha, Columbus (1940)
St. Andrew, Columbus (1955)
Saint Brendan the Navigator Church, Hilliard (1956)
St. Brigid of Kildare, Dublin (1987)
St. Christopher, Columbus (1947)
St. Joan of Arc, Powell (1987)
St. Margaret of Cortona, Columbus (Italian; 1921)
St. Peter, Columbus (1970)
St. Timothy, Columbus (1961)

North High Deanery 
Holy Name, Columbus (1905)
Immaculate Conception, Columbus (1916)
Our Lady of Peace, Columbus (1946)
Parroquia Santa Cruz, Columbus (Hispanic; 1993)
Sacred Heart, Columbus (1875)
St. Francis of Assisi, Columbus (1892)
St. John the Baptist, Columbus (Italian; 1895)
St. Michael the Archangel, Worthington (1946)
St. Thomas More Newman Center, Columbus (1906)

Northland Columbus Deanery 
Church of the Resurrection, New Albany (1983)
St. Anthony, Columbus (1963)
St. Elizabeth, Columbus (1967)
St. James the Less, Columbus (1947)
St. John Neumann, Sunbury (1977)
St. Matthias, Columbus (1956)
St. Paul, Westerville (1913)

West Columbus Deanery 
Holy Family Church (Columbus, Ohio) Columbus (Irish; 1877)
Our Lady of Perpetual Help, Grove City (1954)
Sts. Simon & Jude, West Jefferson (German/Irish; 1867)
St. Agnes, Columbus (1954)
St. Aloysius, Columbus (1906)
St. Cecilia, Columbus (1882)
St. Joseph, Plain City (1864)
St. Mary Magdalene, Columbus (1928)
St. Patrick, London (German/Irish; 1866)
St. Stephen the Martyr, Columbus (Hispanic; 1963)

East Columbus Deanery 
St. John XXIII, Canal Winchester (2000)
Christ the King, Columbus (1946)
Holy Spirit, Columbus (1947)
Our Lady of the Miraculous Medal, Columbus (1967)
St. Elizabeth Ann Seton Parish, Pickerington (1978)
St. Catharine of Siena, Columbus (1931)
St. Mary, Groveport (1871)
St. Matthew, Gahanna (1959)
St. Philip the Apostle, Columbus (1956)
St. Pius X, Reynoldsburg (1958)

Marion Deanery 
Immaculate Conception, Kenton (1866)
Our Lady of Lourdes, Ada (1874)
Our Lady of Lourdes, Marysville (1866)
Sacred Hearts of Jesus & Mary, Cardington (1971)
St. Mary, Delaware (1854)
St. Mary, Marion (1864)

Perry County-Zanesville Deanery 
Church of the Atonement, Crooksville (1902)
Church of the Nativity of the Blessed Virgin Mary, Mattingly Settlement (1856)
Holy Trinity, Somerset (1826)
St. Ann, Dresden (1877)
St. Bernard, Corning (1885)
St. Joseph, Somerset (1818)
St. Nicholas, Zanesville (German; 1842)
St. Patrick, Junction City (1827)
St. Rose of Lima, New Lexington (1867)
St. Thomas Aquinas, Zanesville (Irish/Italian; 1842)

Knox-Licking Deanery 
Church of the Ascension, Johnstown (1912)
Church of the Blessed Sacrament, Newark (1904)
Our Lady of Mt. Carmel, Buckeye Lake (1928)
St. Edward the Confessor, Granville (1947)
St. Francis de Sales, Newark (1844)
St. Leonard, Heath (1962)
St. Luke, Danville (1823)
St. Vincent de Paul, Mt. Vernon (1839)

Tuscawaras-Holmes-Coshocton Deanery 
Holy Trinity, Zoar (1995)
Immacualte Conception, Dennison (Irish; 1870)
Sacred Heart, Coshocton (1897)
Sacred Heart, New Philadelphia (1895)
Sts. Peter & Paul, Glenmont (1855)
St. Francis de Sales, Newcomerstown (1918)
St. Joseph, Dover (German/Italian; 1848)
St. Peter, Millersburg (1877)

Lancaster Deanery 
St. Bernadette, Lancaster (1963)
St. Mary, Bremen (1917)
St. Mark, Lancaster (1959)
Basilica of St. Mary of the Assumption, Lancaster (1819)
St. John the Evangelist, Logan (1838)
St. Joseph, Sugar Grove (1892)

Chillicothe Deanery 
Holy Trinity, Jackson (1880)
Sts. Peter & Paul, Wellston (1881)
St. Colman of Cloyne, Washington Courthouse (1881)
St. Joseph, Circleville (1845)
St. Mary, Chillicothe (1837)
St. Mary Queen of the Missions, Waverly (1878)
St. Peter, Chillicothe (German; 1846)
St. Sylvester, Zaleski (Irish; 1864)

Scioto County Deanery 
Holy Redeemer, Portsmouth (Irish; 1853)
Holy Trinity, Pond Creek (French; 1854)
St. Mary of the Annunciation, (German; 1850)
St. Peter in Chains, Wheelersburg (1849)

Education

Museum of Catholic Art and History 
The diocese is also home to the Museum of Catholic Art and History, the largest institution of its kind in the United States It was founded in 1998 as the Jubilee Museum.

Colleges
Mount Carmel College of Nursing, Columbus
Ohio Dominican University, Columbus
Pontifical College Josephinum, Columbus (Jurisdiction of the Apostolic Nuncio)

High schools
Bishop Hartley High School, Columbus
Bishop Ready High School, Columbus
Bishop Rosecrans High School, Zanesville
Bishop Watterson High School, Columbus
Cristo Rey Columbus High School, Columbus
Newark Catholic High School, Newark
Notre Dame High School, Portsmouth
Saint Charles Preparatory School, Columbus
St. Francis DeSales High School, Columbus
Tuscarawas Central Catholic High School, New Philadelphia
William V. Fisher Catholic High School, Lancaster

Closed schools
Marion Catholic High School, Marion
St. Ladislas School, Columbus
Corpus Christi School, Columbus
St. Mary High School, Columbus
Holy Family School, Columbus
Holy Name School, Columbus
Bishop Flaget High School, Chillicothe (Currently a grade school)
Father Wehrle High School, Columbus
St. Leo School, Columbus
St. Peter, Chillicothe
St. Mary, Chillicothe
St. Aloysius Academy, New Lexington
St. Thomas the Apostle Grade School, Columbus
Holy Rosary (Grade School & High School)
St. Rose of Lima, New Lexington (closed 2021)

Elementary schools
All Saints Academy, Columbus
Bishop Fenwick, Zanesville
Bishop Flaget, Chillicothe
Blessed Sacrament, Newark
Holy Spirit, Whitehall
Holy Trinity, Somerset
Immaculate Conception, Columbus
Immaculate Conception, Dennison
Notre Dame Elementary, Portsmouth
Our Lady of Bethlehem, Columbus
Our Lady of Peace, Columbus
Our Lady of Perpetual Help, Grove City
Sacred Heart, Coshocton
St. Agatha, Columbus
St. Andrew, Columbus
St. Anthony, Columbus
St. Bernadette, Lancaster
St. Brendan, Hilliard
St. Brigid of Kildare, Dublin
St. Catharine, Columbus
St. Cecilia, Columbus
St. Francis de Sales, Newark
St. James the Less, Columbus
St. John, Logan
St. Joseph Montessori, Columbus
St. Mary Elementary, Lancaster
St. Mary Magdalene, Columbus
St. Mary, Columbus
St. Mary, Delaware
St. Mary, Marion
St. Matthew, Gahanna
St. Matthias, Columbus
St. Michael, Worthington
St. Patrick, London
St. Paul, Westerville
St. Pius X, Reynoldsburg
St. Timothy, Columbus
St. Vincent de Paul, Mt. Vernon
Sts. Peter and Paul, Wellston
Trinity Elementary, Columbus
Tuscarawas Central Catholic Elementary School, Dover

Hospitals

Current hospitals 
Genesis HealthCare System, Zanesville (combination of Good Samaritan Hospital and Bethesda Hospital). Good Samaritan Hospital began in 1900 and is co-sponsored by the Franciscan Sisters of Christian Charity of Manitowoc, Wisconsin.
Mt. Carmel Hospitals, Columbus (Mt. Carmel, East; Mt. Carmel, West; St. Ann, Westerville). Mt. Carmel opened in 1886, by the Sisters of the Holy Cross from St. Mary's, Indiana. In 1972, Mt. Carmel East opened to serve the suburbs. Also, St. Ann's Hospital was bought by Mt. Carmel in 1995. At one time, St. Ann's was operated by the Sisters of St. Francis of Penance and Christian Charity.
Trinity Hospital Twin City, Dennison. Bought by the Sisters of St. Francis of Sylvania in May 2011.

Closed hospitals 
St. Francis Hospital, Columbus (1862–1955). Operated by the Sisters of the Poor of St. Francis. The building was razed in 1957 and today it is the site of Grant Hospital.
St. Anthony's Hospital, Columbus (1891–1991). Also operated by the Sisters of the Poor of St. Francis. The original building was razed in 1971 and was finally sold in 1991. It is now part of the Ohio State University hospital system.
San Antonio Hospital, Kenton (1897–1963). The Sisters of Charity of Cincinnati owned the facilities.
Mercy Hospital, Mt. Vernon (1919–1975). Owned by the Sisters of Charity of Nazareth. This hospital closed and merged with the local public hospital of Mt. Vernon.
Mercy Hospital, Portsmouth (1917–1981). This hospital was owned by the Sisters of St. Francis of the Congregation of Our Lady of Lourdes from Rochester, Minnesota. It was sold to the community hospital in the city.

Religious institutes

Religious priests and brothers 
Apostles of Jesus

Congregation of the Holy Spirit

Congregation of Clerics Regular of the Divine Providence (Theatines) 

St. Joseph, Dover
Holy Trinity , Zoar
Christ the King, Columbus
Fathers of Mercy

Glenmary Home Missioners

Heralds of the Good News
St. John Neumann, Sunbury
Church of the Resurrection, New Albany
Institute of Christ the King Sovereign Priest (ICKSP)
St. Leo, Merion Village
Institute of the Incarnate Word

Missionaries of the Precious Blood

St. James the Less, Columbus

Missionary Servants of the Word

St. Stephen the Martyr, Columbus
St. Agnes, Columbus
Order of the Blessed Virgin Mary of Mercy (Mercerdarians)
Holy Family, Columbus 
Order of Friars Minor

Order of Preachers (Dominicans)

Holy Trinity, Somerset
Pontifical College Josephinum
Ohio Dominican University
St. Joseph, Somerset
St. Patrick, Columbus
Society of the Catholic Apostolate (Pallottines)
Sacred Heart, Columbus
St. Christopher 

Sons of the Immaculate Conception Congregation
Mt. Carmel Hospitals
St. Elizabeth, Columbus

Religious sisters
Franciscan Sisters of the Immaculate Heart of Mary (from Kerala), St. Peter Chillicothe 
The Bridgettine Sisters (Order of the Most Holy Savior), Holy Family Church, Columbus
Third Order of St. Francis (Joliet), Columbus
Little Servant Sisters of the Immaculate Conception, Columbus, St. John Paul II Education Center 
Salesian Sisters of Don Bosco, St. Francis DeSales High School, Columbus 
Sisters of Charity of Cincinnati, Columbus and Mount Vernon
Sisters of Notre Dame de Namur, Columbus
Sisters of the Good Shepherd, Columbus
Sisters of the Holy Cross, Columbus
Dominican Sisters of Peace, Columbus
Dominican Sisters of the Immaculate Conception, Columbus
Carmelite Sisters for the Aged and Infirm, Columbus
Sisters of St. Francis of Penance and Christian Charity, Columbus
Dominican Sisters of Mary, Mother of the Eucharist, St. Michael School, Worthington
Dominican Sisters of the Immaculate Conception, Columbus 
Franciscan Sisters of Christian Charity, Zanesville
Franciscan Sisters of the Immaculate Heart of Mary 
Leaven of the Immaculate Heart of Mary, Portsmouth 
Daughters of Holy Mary of the Heart of Jesus

Catholic radio in the diocese

WVSG 820 AM Saint Gabriel Radio (the former WOSU (AM))
WFOT at 89.5 FM licensed to Lexington and serving the Mansfield area. Annunciation Radio airs programming from EWTN Global Catholic Radio. WFOT broadcasts as a simulcast of WNOC.

Other stations reaching the diocese 
WULM "Radio Maria" 1600 AM in Springfield Radio Maria USA is based at originating station KJMJ 580 AM in Alexandria, Louisiana.
WNOP "Sacred Heart Radio" 720 AM licensed to Newport, Kentucky and based in Cincinnati which also airs local and EWTN programming...plus an FM sister, WHSS 89.5 in Hamilton.

Clergy abuse scandal

History 
In 1993, Bishop Griffin removed a priest, Phillip Jacobs, from his parish due to allegations that he had sexually abused a teenage boy.  The boy's family requested that the police not be notified, but years later Griffin made the notification.  When the Diocese of Victoria in British Columbia was considering hiring Jacobs, Griffin informed the diocese about the allegations against him.  The Diocese of Victoria hired Jacobs anyway.  In 2019, Jacobs was arrested in Victoria, British Columbia for sexual abuse of minors.

On August 17, 2018, Bishop Campbell and the diocese were named in a $2 million lawsuit by Kevin Heidtman, a former student at St. Charles Preparatory School in Columbus.  Heidtman alleged that he was sexually molested on at least six separate occasions at the school by Monsignor Thomas Bennett between 2002 and 2003. Bennett died in 2008. The lawsuit alleged that the defendants, including Campbell, became aware of Bennett's alleged molestation of the student, but failed to take any action.  After Heidtman filed suit, two other students came forward with accusations again Bennett.  On February 8, 2019, Heidtman's attorney filed a motion to force the diocese to release all their sexual abuse files; the Diocese opposed it. On August 26, 2020, the diocese paid $1 million to Heidtman. 

On March 1, 2019, the Diocese released a list of 36 of its clergy that had sexually abused children, and updated the liist to number nearly 50 in September of the same year  

Until 2020, the Diocese of Columbus was one of only three Catholic dioceses in the nation to have a priest serve as victim assistance coordinator. Victim advocates criticized this practice, saying it can re-traumatize survivors and discourage the reporting of abuse. An outside licensed counselor was hired in 2020, coinciding with the formation of a Safe Environment Task Force by then-bishop Brennan.

List of credibly accused clergy 
I.  Clergy incardinated in the Diocese of Columbus against whom a credible allegation of sexual abuse of a minor within the Diocese was made and investigated while the clergy was living.

II.  Clergy incardinated in the Diocese of Columbus against whom a credible allegation of sexual abuse of a minor within the Diocese was made after the clergy's death.[1] 

III.  Clergy incardinated in the Diocese of Columbus against whom a credible allegation of sexual abuse of a minor at a location outside the Diocese was made and investigated while the cleric was living. 

IV.  Extern or religious clergy (clergy from other dioceses or religious orders) who served in the Diocese of Columbus who were credibly accused of sexual abuse of minors (alleged conduct occurred in the Diocese of Columbus). 

V.  Extern or religious clergy who served in the Diocese of Columbus that were credibly accused of sexual abuse of minors elsewhere (alleged conduct occurred outside the Diocese of Columbus).

Counselor

References

External links 
Diocesan website

 
Columbus
Roman Catholic Ecclesiastical Province of Cincinnati
Religious organizations established in 1868
Religion in Columbus, Ohio
Columbus
1868 establishments in Ohio